Alberto López Arteseros (born 9 March 1988) is a Spanish footballer who plays as a winger.

Club career
López joined in RCD Mallorca's youth system in 1999, aged 11, and made his senior debuts with the B-team in 2007–08 season, in the fourth division. He made his professional – and La Liga – debut on 20 April 2008, in a 4–1 away win over Real Murcia.

In July 2012 López moved abroad, signing a contract with Pierikos F.C. However, after appearing sparingly in Greece, he returned to his country a year later, signing contract with CE Constància.

References

External links
 
 Futbolme profile

1988 births
Living people
Footballers from Palma de Mallorca
Spanish footballers
Spanish expatriate footballers
Spanish expatriate sportspeople in Greece
Association football wingers
RCD Mallorca B players
RCD Mallorca players
Pierikos F.C. players
CE Constància players